Lee Arnold Petty (March 14, 1914 – April 5, 2000) was an American stock car racing driver who competed during the 1950s and 1960s. He was one of the pioneers of NASCAR and one of its first superstars. He was NASCAR's first three-time Cup champion.  He is also the father of Richard Petty, who went on to become one of the most successful stock car racing drivers of all time.

Career

Petty was born near Randleman, North Carolina, the son of Jessie Maude (née Bell) and Judson Ellsworth Petty. He was thirty-five years old when he began racing. He participated in NASCAR's inaugural race, held at the three-quarter mile long dirt track, Charlotte Speedway; he raced in a 1948 Buick Roadmaster he borrowed from his neighbor under the assurance that the prize money earned from the race could pay off any damages to the car. With son Richard watching, Petty lost control of the car and rolled it in turn three. Basing on his earlier experience as an occasional moonshine runner, Petty would take factory cars to a local service station, pull the mufflers off the car and go racing.

He finished in the top five in season points for NASCAR's first eleven seasons and won the NASCAR Grand National Series driver's championship three times. Petty was also the winner of the inaugural Daytona 500 in 1959.

Controversies

Twice in his career, Petty was declared the winner of a race after scoring errors were discovered following the race. The two races were the 1959 Daytona 500 and the 1959 Lakewood 500.

1959 Daytona 500
In the inaugural race at Daytona International Speedway, Petty battled with Johnny Beauchamp during the final laps of the race. Petty, Beauchamp, and Joe Weatherly drove side by side by side across the finish line at the final lap for a photo finish. Petty drove a 1959 Oldsmobile Super 88 (No. 42), while Beauchamp drove a 1959 Ford Thunderbird (No. 73) and Weatherly did so in a 1959 Chevrolet (No. 48), all coupés. Beauchamp was unofficially declared the winner, and he drove to victory lane. Petty protested the results, saying "I had Beauchamp by a good two feet. In my own mind, I know I won." It took NASCAR founder Bill France Sr. three days to decide the winner. In the end, with the help of the national newsreel, Petty was officially declared the winner. His son Richard drove a 1957 Oldsmobile convertible (No. 43) and finished 57th out of the 59 starters after blowing an engine after eight laps.

In a 1999 interview over the controversial finish, Petty expressed his belief that France Sr. knew Petty won, but purposely called Beauchamp the winner to intentionally cause controversy. Petty stated, "France would have done anything to generate publicity for his racetracks."

1959 Lakewood 500
During a stock car race at Lakewood in Atlanta, Georgia, Petty's son Richard raced against Lee, a teammate to his father on Petty Enterprises. After a side-by-side duel with his father, Richard passed Lee with less than 10 laps to go and went on to win the race. It was one of Richard's first races and he became a first-time Cup series winner during his rookie year. Hours after the race was over, officials changed the official results after a protest was filed by Lee. Lee protested that Richard was one lap down and was credited with an extra lap. Richard was demoted to third and Lee was declared the race winner. In the days that followed, Lee was quoted as saying in a newspaper, "I would have protested my mother if I needed to."

Retirement

1961 Daytona 500 and career-ending crash
During the second race of the Twin Qualifying Events of the 1961 Daytona 500, Johnny Beauchamp lost control and caught Petty's bumper, sending both cars through the guardrail and out of the track. Petty's car struck spectator A. B. Kelley who suffered multiple cuts but still helped evacuate Petty from the twisted metal. Petty and Beauchamp were no strangers to each other as they were previously involved in the first Daytona 500 finish which took place two years earlier. Petty suffered numerous life-threatening injuries, including multiple fractures, internal injuries, and a punctured lung that forced him to stay in the Daytona Hospital for four months. The crash ultimately led to the end of Petty's regular driving career, though he sporadically competed in later events; his final race took place in 1964 at The Glen.

Petty Enterprises

He was the father of Richard Petty, who became NASCAR's record holder for race wins. With sons Richard and Maurice Petty, he founded Petty Enterprises, which became NASCAR's most successful racing team. He was the grandfather of Kyle Petty, and the great-grandfather of Adam Petty, who died in a crash during a Busch Series practice session at New Hampshire International Speedway. He is also the grandfather of Ritchie Petty, who ran a few races in NASCAR. His nephew Dale Inman worked for Petty Enterprises as Richard's crew chief from the early 1960s until 1981 and during the 1990s.

Awards
In 1990, Petty was inducted into the International Motorsports Hall of Fame.
He was inducted in the Motorsports Hall of Fame of America in 1996.
He was elected to the North Carolina Sports Hall of Fame.
He was selected as one of NASCAR's 50 Greatest Drivers in 1998 along with his son, Richard Petty.
He was inducted into the NASCAR Hall of Fame on May 23, 2011.

Teams
Petty Enterprises (1949–1964)
Gary Drake (1954)
Carl Krueger (1955)
Fred Frazier (1956)

Death
Petty died at 4:50 a.m. on April 5, 2000, at Moses H. Cone Memorial Hospital in Greensboro, North Carolina, three weeks after his 86th birthday, several weeks after undergoing surgery for an abdominal aortic aneurysm—a tear in the aorta vessel near the stomach that grows until cardiac arrest. Despite the surgery, his condition deteriorated and he died of abdominal aortic dissection. He was buried at the Level Cross United Methodist Church Cemetery in Randleman, North Carolina. Lee died just three days after his great-grandson Adam made his Winston Cup Series debut; Adam would be killed at the age of nineteen years old just 5 weeks later from a practice race crash.

Motorsports career results

NASCAR
(key) (Bold – Pole position awarded by qualifying time. Italics – Pole position earned by points standings or practice time. * – Most laps led.)

Grand National Series

Daytona 500

References

External links
Lee Petty article from the International Motor Sports Hall of Fame

1914 births
2000 deaths
Burials in North Carolina
Deaths from abdominal aortic aneurysm
International Motorsports Hall of Fame inductees
NASCAR Cup Series champions
NASCAR drivers
People from Randleman, North Carolina
Petty family
Richard Petty
Racing drivers from North Carolina
NASCAR Hall of Fame inductees